Lahijan-e Gharbi Rural District is in Lajan District of Piranshahr County, West Azerbaijan province, Iran. At the National Census of 2006, its population was 6,904 in 1,257 households. There were 7,169 inhabitants in 1,704 households at the following census of 2011. At the most recent census of 2016, the population of the rural district was 6,261 in 1,614 households. The largest of its 19 villages was Jaldian, with 1,570 people.

References 

Piranshahr County

Rural Districts of West Azerbaijan Province

Populated places in West Azerbaijan Province

Populated places in Piranshahr County